Lucky Luke is a Belgian comic book series that began in 1946.

Lucky Luke may also refer to the following adaptations of the series:

 Lucky Luke (1984 TV series), an animated television series starring William Callaway
 Lucky Luke (1991 film), an Italian film adaptation starring Terence Hill
 Lucky Luke (1992 TV series), an Italian television series based on the film, starring Terence Hill
 Lucky Luke (2009 film), a French/Argentine film adaptation starring Jean Dujardin
 Lucky Luke, the name of several video games based on the character; see Lucky Luke#Video games